The Men's U23 Pan-American Volleyball Cup is a bi-annual Continental Cup organized by NORCECA for under-23 teams from South, North and Central America, and the Caribbean.

Results

Medal table

Teams by year

MVP by edition
2012 –  Rogério Carvalho
2014 –  Osniel Rendón
2016 –  Germán Johansen
2018 –  Roamy Alonso
2021 –  Josué López

See also
 Men's Pan-American Volleyball Cup
 Men's Junior Pan-American Volleyball Cup
 Boys' Youth Pan-American Volleyball Cup

References

External links
 NORCECA

Pan-American Volleyball Cup
Men's Pan-American Volleyball Cup
Recurring sporting events established in 2012
2012 establishments in North America
2012 establishments in South America